North Hills, known previously as Sepulveda, is a neighborhood in the San Fernando Valley region of Los Angeles, California.

North Hills was originally part of an agricultural community known as Mission Acres. After WWII, the newly developed suburban community was renamed Sepulveda, after the prominent Sepúlveda family of California. In 1991, it was renamed North Hills.

Geography
North Hills is located in the central San Fernando Valley region of the City of Los Angeles, 21 miles northwest of downtown. North Hills is bounded by Balboa Boulevard and Bull Creek ("the wash") on the west, Devonshire and Lassen Street on the north, the Pacoima Wash on the east, and Roscoe Boulevard on the south.

Surrounding neighborhoods are Northridge to the west, Panorama City to the east, Van Nuys to the south, and Granada Hills to the north. The neighborhood is divided into North Hills West and North Hills East by California Interstate 405, known locally as "the 405".

Overlapping Area codes 747 and 818 serve the area. The North Hills ZIP code is 91343.

History

In the late 18th and 19th century the site was part of the Mission San Fernando Rey de España lands, until 1846 when it became part of the Rancho Ex-Mission San Fernando of Andrés Pico, near the Andrés Pico Adobe.

Mission Acres was an agricultural community made by early developers who created 1 acre plots for agricultural activities, with irrigation supplied by the Los Angeles Aqueduct in 1913. The community was a stop for the Pacific Electric railway streetcars that transported passengers from downtown Los Angeles to the San Fernando Valley.

Residents of Mission Acres renamed the area Sepulveda in 1927. The Californio Sepulveda family, going back to the founding of the Pueblo of Los Angeles, is the source of various Los Angeles place-names, including the post-war community of Sepulveda. Sepulveda Boulevard is the primary north–south street through North Hills, crossing Sepulveda Pass to the south. The community saw significant growth between the 1930s and the 1950s.

In 1937, councilman Jim Wilson offered a resolution that instructed the city's real estate agent to make the right of way cost appraisal for diverting flood waters from Wilson and East Canyons into Pacoima Wash to protect the community of Sepulveda from floods that occurred during heavy storms.

The area remained mostly rural through the 1940s, urbanization initiated during the 50s during which the entire San Fernando Valley was experiencing a transition from semi-rural and agricultural uses into a suburban development patterns. Multi-family residential units began to be developed in the 1960s.

In 1991, residents of the western half of Sepulveda, west of the San Diego Freeway, voted to secede from the eastern section to form a new community named North Hills. The City of Los Angeles soon changed the name of remaining Sepulveda to North Hills also.  The city then formed a new sub-neighborhood of "North Hills West" which begins west of the 405 freeway and goes to Bull Creek Wash/Balboa Blvd. and from Roscoe Blvd. to Devonshire St. The eastern section became the sub-neighborhood of North Hills East.

North Hills East boundaries are east of the 405-San Diego Freeway, along the Pacoima Wash, South of Lassen, and North of Roscoe.

In June 1999, a damaged airplane landed safely on Hayvenhurst Avenue on its way to Van Nuys Airport.

As of 2020, about 242 (1.3%) of the approximately 17,977 occupied structures in North Hills were built in 1939 or earlier, 34.9% were built from 1940 to 1959, 3.4% from 1960 to 1979, 5.2% from 2000 to 2009, 0.9% from 2010 to 2013, and 1% from 2014 or later.

Government

Local government 

North Hills is governed locally by the City of Los Angeles and is represented in the Los Angeles City Council by the members elected for districts 6, 7 and 12; each district includes three different sections of the neighborhood.

Neighborhood Councils 

Both North Hills East and North Hills West Neighborhood Councils work together to improve the overall quality of life in North Hills communities.

North Hills West Neighborhood Council was certified in 2003. Their slogan is "Fostering Community," and its logo is of a green tree in the city. The 2012-2014  North Hills West Neighborhood Council was seated into office on September 20, 2012. A northwestern section became part of the Northridge East Neighborhood Council in 2013.

North Hills East Neighborhood Council was certified in 2010. It has a growing, multicultural group of neighbors dedicated to service and community activism. In early 2014, North Hills East Neighborhood Council was approved as an Official Certifying Organization for the President's Volunteer Service Awards program, which is an initiative of the Corporation for National and Community Service, the same organization responsible for AmeriCorps and Senior Corps. This status as an Official Certifying Organization has enabled the North Hills East Neighborhood Council to verify hours and eligibility for volunteers to receive an award, which, depending on number of hours worked can range from a pin to a personalized letter from the President of the United States. More about the awards can be found here: www.presidentialserviceawards.gov Volunteers do not have to be a resident or stakeholder of North Hills East to qualify for a President's Volunteer Service Award.

Federal and State legislature representation 
The neighborhood is represented federally by the congress member elected for California's 29th congressional district and both senators from California. On the state level, it is represented by the state assembly member elected for California State Assembly District 46 and the state senator elected for California State Senate District 18.

Demographics
In 2009, the Los Angeles Times's "Mapping L.A." project supplied these North Hills community statistics: median household income: $52,456.  Population size is 60,254 according to 2010 Census data. This summarizes both sides of the 405 freeway. The North Hills West neighborhood had 24,000 residents in 2009. The North Hills East neighborhood had nearly 40,000 residents in 2010.

Education

Public schools
The community is served by schools in the Los Angeles Unified School District.

Gledhill Street Elementary School, Langdon Avenue Elementary School, Mayall Street School, and Parthenia Street School serve North Hills.

Most students attend Sepulveda Middle School. Those students residing west of Woodley Avenue attend Holmes Middle School.

North Hills high school students attend James Monroe High School.

There are magnet programs in some schools, such as the Sepulveda Middle School which has a Gifted / High Ability Magnet, and Kennedy High School which has an Architecture/Digital Arts Magnet. A school bus is provided if pupils are more than 5 miles away from the school. North Hills West is also served by charter schools of all grades.

Local School District Administration

Private schools
The private and parochial schools in North Hills include Valley Park Baptist, Valley Presbyterian School, Heritage Christian, Our Lady of Peace, and Church of the Living Word. Los Angeles Baptist High School also serves the community and in 2012, was combined with Heritage Christian High School.

Several North Hills residents serve as host families to international students studying in the US. As of early 2014, about 50 foreign exchange students are attending school in the North Hills area. Host families get to share their way of life and culture with the students, and at the same time learn more about the students and their home countries.

Public library 
The Los Angeles Public Library Mid-Valley Regional Branch, one of the biggest in the San Fernando Valley, is located on Nordhoff Street at Woodley Avenue in North Hills.

Infrastructure 
California Interstate 405 has direct access to the neighborhood on two points: exit 68 on Roscoe Boulevard and exit 69 on Nordhoff Street. Main thoroughfares include Sepulveda and Roscoe Boulevards; Hayvenhurst, Woodley, and Haskell Avenues; Lassen, Plummer, and Nordhoff Streets. These thoroughfares, as is the case in the most of the San Fernando Valley. are arranged in a grid pattern with north–south ways labeled as avenues and east–west ways labeled as streets. 

Bicycle infrastructure in the neighborhood includes marked street-side bike lanes on Devonshire Street, on Nordhoff Street starting eastward from Orion Avenue, Parthenia Street eastward from Burnet Avenue, and south-north lanes on Woodley Avenue. Plummer Street is designated as a bike route, allowing cyclists to share space with other vehicular traffic.

The Los Angeles County Metropolitan Transportation Authority operates Metro Bus local lines 152, 166, 167, 234, and 237 through the neighborhood and the Los Angeles Department of Transportation's Panorama City/Van Nuys DASH route also runs through part of the neighborhood.

North Hills is home to the large Veterans Administration Sepulveda Ambulatory Care Center campus, which serves veterans in the San Fernando Valley, with residential and outpatient care.

Films 
There are many locations in North Hills that have been used for various films such as "Terminator 2: Judgement Day", "Halloween (2007 film)", "Halloween II (2009 film)", "American Beauty (1999 film)", and "Step Brothers (film)".

Many of the films were shot in the Sepulveda VA Clinic to shoot large shots to captivate wide scenes, such as in the movie Step Brothers, the area is used to show a large fight between two men and a large group of kids. In one of the most famous scenes in the film Terminator 2: Judgement Day, after thinking John the main protagonist finally escaped the T-1000, due to some help from the T-800, John is surprised when the T-1000 drives a semi truck through the overpass wall of Bull Creek, a flood control channel located in North Hills.

Notable people

Bart Andrus, professional football coach and former collegiate player
Sharon Shapiro, gymnast

Notes

References

External links

 North Hills West Neighborhood Council
 North Hills East Neighborhood Council
 Los Angeles Times, Real Estate section, Neighborly Advice column: "[North Hills:] Treasures amid Valley bustle" (1 Feb 2004)

Communities in the San Fernando Valley
Neighborhoods in Los Angeles